The Lisbon Creek is a river in Mangrove Cay, the Bahamas.

See also
List of rivers of the Bahamas

References

Rivers of the Bahamas